Otto Ernst (7 September 1898 – 28 February 1940) was a Chilean footballer. He played in four matches for the Chile national football team from 1913 to 1924. He was also part of Chile's squad for the 1924 South American Championship.

References

External links
 

1898 births
1940 deaths
Chilean footballers
Chile international footballers
Place of birth missing
Association football defenders
Santiago National F.C. players
Magallanes footballers